The King–Nash House, also known as Patrick J. King House, is a combination of Sullivanesque, Colonial Revival, and Prairie styles house in the East Garfield Park area of Chicago, Illinois, United States.  The house was built in 1901 by George W. Maher for Patrick J. King. From 1925 until his death in 1943, it was home to Chicago political boss Patrick Nash.

It was listed on the U.S. National Register of Historic Places in 1983.  It was designated a Chicago Landmark on February 10, 1988.

Gallery

References

External links
"George Washington Maher – architect of the King–Nash House"
Page on the fireplace surround in the Los Angeles County Museum of Art collection and "Becoming Movable," a project by artist Ryan Griffis commissioned by LACMA about the object

Houses completed in 1901
Houses on the National Register of Historic Places in Chicago
Chicago Landmarks